PwC Plaza is a 475-ft (145 m) tall skyscraper in Minneapolis, Minnesota. It was completed in 1987 and has 36 floors. It is the tallest mixed-use building in Minneapolis and contains offices, including the Minneapolis office of London-based professional services firm PricewaterhouseCoopers and the Royal Sonesta Minneapolis Downtown hotel.

See also
List of tallest buildings in Minneapolis

References

Emporis

Skyscraper office buildings in Minneapolis
Skyscraper hotels in Minneapolis

WZMH Architects buildings
Commercial buildings completed in 1987
1987 establishments in Minnesota